A Sali or Cali or Tebetebe is a war club from Fiji.

Uses in Fiji
Usually cut from a hardwood type iron wood it is intended for war. It differs from the Gata by the width of its striking head. It is named Sali because of its resemblance to the clawed flower of the plant of the same name (Sali) of the genus Musa of the banana family.

See also
 Totokia
 Ula 
 Gata
 Culacula
 Bulibuli

References

Bibliography
 John Charles Edler, Terence Barrow, Art of Polynesia, Hemmeter Publishing Corporation, 1990.
 Rod Ewins, Fijian Artefacts: The Tasmanian Museum and Art Gallery Collection, Tasmanian Museum and Art Gallery, 1982.
 Bulletin of the Fiji Museum, Numeros 1–2, Fiji Museum, 1973.
 Fergus Clunie,Fijian weapons and warfare. Fiji Museum 2003, .

 
Clubs (weapon)
Primitive weapons
Ritual weapons
Fijian culture